A punch line is the conclusion of a joke.

Punch line or punchline may also refer to:

Film, television, video games and comics
 Punch Line, a Japanese anime television series produced by MAPPA.
 Punch Line (video game), a video game based on the anime series.
 Punchline (company), a video game developer.
 Punchline (film), a 1988 American film written and directed by David Seltzer.
 Punchlines, a British comedy game show.
 Punchline (DC Comics), a DC Comics supervillain.

Music
 Punchline (band), an American pop punk band
 Punchline (rapper), longtime partner of rapper Wordsworth
 The Punch Line, an album by Minutemen, 1981
 "Punchline", an instrumental by The Beach Boys from Good Vibrations: Thirty Years of The Beach Boys

Other uses
 Punch Line San Francisco, a comedy club in San Francisco
 The Punchline, a comedy club in Atlanta, Georgia, US
 Punch line (ice hockey), a line for the 1940s Montreal Canadiens